The Orpheum Theatre is a live performance and musical theater in downtown Madison, Wisconsin, located one block from the Wisconsin State Capitol.

History
Built in 1926 by Rapp and Rapp, the Limestone, Art Deco exterior and French Renaissance interior made the building an icon, with the "Orpheum" sign towering over State Street. There have been limited changes to the structure of the building over the years. The terrazzo floors, chandeliers, grand staircase, and statue of Orpheus overlooking the entryway are still intact. Partially financed by dentist William Beecroft, also known as "Mr. Theater," The Orpheum cost $750,000 to build and originally featured vaudeville shows and a movie theater, later featuring contemporary artists and film. The Orpheum sponsors the yearly Madison Independent Film Festival and serves food daily from its Lobby Lounge restaurant.

Facts
The Orpheum Theatre was the first building in Wisconsin to have air conditioning; the air conditioner itself takes up an entire room in the basement. Furthermore, it was the first building on its block between Johnson Street and State Street.
The Orpheum Theatre originally seated 2,400 people. After renovations in the 1960s to add "The Stage Door" Theatre, only six feet of the original stage was left, and 700 seats were lost, making the capacity 1700.  At the time, the Orpheum was part of the 20th Century Theaters chain.
The Orpheum nearly burned down on December 19, 2004. It was the third attempted arson on the building. Several other Madison landmark music establishments such as O'Cayz Corral and the Club deWash had burned down mysteriously in previous years.

The Orpheum Theatre in Madison is on The National Register of Historic Places listings in Wisconsin

See also
House Of Blues

References

Buildings and structures in Madison, Wisconsin
Culture of Madison, Wisconsin
Music venues in Wisconsin
Theatres on the National Register of Historic Places in Wisconsin
Vaudeville theaters
National Register of Historic Places in Madison, Wisconsin
1927 establishments in Wisconsin
Theatres completed in 1927